Popo Football Club is a Pakistani professional football club based in Islamabad, Pakistan. It has under-21 and under-16 teams.

History

PFF era 
Popo made its PFF debut in the 2020 PFF National Challenge Cup. They shockingly defeated STM in their debut match. Afterwards they tied with Karachi Port Trust.

Facilities
It is one of the few teams in the city to have two training grounds. Popo FC has an affiliation with NFA Pakistan. The teams wear black and white; or yellow, blue and white. It has sponsorship from Armani Coffee Lounge. Popo Fc Give Salaries To Their Players On The Base Of Their Capabilities. Popo Fc Provide Huge Opportunities for The Players To Make Their Self Worthy Enough To Get Paid. Popo Fc Take A Huge Amount Of Players To Foreign Countries On Different Futsal Events. Likely Netherlands, Saudia, Oman, Qatar, Argentina, Brazil, Portugal, Spain and Dubai.

References

External links 
Popo F.C.

Association football clubs established in 2012
2012 establishments in Pakistan
Football clubs in Pakistan
Football in Islamabad